"Get It Together" is a song by Seal. It was released as the lead single from his fourth studio album Seal IV after the scrapping of Togetherland. "Get It Together" went to number one on the US dance charts

Formats and track listings
Maxi CD single
"Get It Together" (Lost Boys Radio Edit) – 3:50
"Get It Together" (Album Version) – 4:21
"Get It Together" (Bill Hamel Vocal Mix) – 10:12
"Get It Together" (Junior Jack Mainstream Mix) – 4:06
 U.S. maxi CD single
"Get It Together" (Album Version) - 4:25
"Get It Together" (Peter Rauhofer Classic Club Mix) - 7:40
"Get It Together" (Superchumbo's Guiding Light Mix) - 9:09
"Get It Together" (Bill Hamel Vocal Mix) - 10:07
"Get It Together" (Wide Horizon Remix) - 8:18
"Get It Together" (Roy's Soldiers Of Universal Love Remix) - 7:25

Charts

See also
 List of number-one dance singles of 2003 (U.S.)

References

2002 singles
Seal (musician) songs
Songs written by Seal (musician)
Song recordings produced by Trevor Horn
Songs written by Mark Batson
2002 songs